Alex N. Dragnich (Ferry County, Washington, 22 February 1912 – Bowie, Maryland, 10 August 2009) was a distinguished Serbian-American political scientist, author of several works on the Balkans.

Biography
Born on 22 February 1912, he was the son of Serbian immigrants from Montenegro,who had a homestead in Ferry County in the State of Washington. In his youth, he attended elementary and high school there and worked on his parents' farm during the Great Depression. Upon graduation from high school, he enrolled at the University of Washington in Seattle in 1934 and graduated Phi Beta Kappa in 1938. He then went on to obtain his master's degree in 1940. For the next two years, he did graduate work at the University of California at Berkeley where he obtained his doctorate in 1942 but wartime service delayed his Ph.D. until 1945.

During the Second World War Dragnich served as a foreign affairs analyst for the Department of Justice and the Office of Strategic Services. From 1947 to 1950 he joined the U.S. Foreign Service and served as Public Affairs Officer at the U.S. Embassy in Belgrade. It was during his service in communist Yugoslavia that Dragnich first found out about the Tito-Stalin split of 1948.

In 1950 he became was a professor at Vanderbilt University in Nashville, Tennessee where he spend more than a quarter century before taking his retirement.He carried out various studies on the Balkans, including critical works on characters and personages such as Josip Broz Titoand Nikola Pašić.

Work
 Tito's Promised Land (Rutgers University Press, 1954).
 Major European governments (Dorsey Press, 1961).
 Serbia, Nikola Pašić, and Yugoslavia (Rutgers University Press, 1974).
 The Development of Parliamentary Government in Serbia (Columbia University Press, 1978).
 The First Yugoslavia: Search for a Viable Political System (Hoover Institution Press, 1983).
 The Saga of Kosovo: Focus on Serbian-Albanian Relations (Columbia University Press, 1984), junto a Slavko Todorovich.
 Serbs and Croats: The Struggle in Yugoslavia (Harcourt Brace Jovanovich, 1992).

See also
 List of Serbian Americans

References 

 Translated and adapted from Spanish Wikipedia: https://es.wikipedia.org/wiki/Alex_N._Dragnich

Bibliography 

 
 
 
 
 
 
 
 
 
 
 

1912 births
2009 deaths
American political scientists
American people of Serbian descent
University of Washington alumni
University of California, Berkeley alumni
Vanderbilt University faculty
People from Ferry County, Washington
20th-century political scientists